The Haunted Castle is a 1960 West German comedy film directed by Kurt Hoffmann. It was entered into the 2nd Moscow International Film Festival where it won the Silver Prize. The film is a sequel to The Spessart Inn (1958) and was followed by Glorious Times at the Spessart Inn (1967). It was shot at the Bavaria Studios in Munich. The film's sets were designed by the art directors Hein Heckroth and Willy Schatz.

Cast

References

External links
 

1960 films
1960s comedy horror films
1960 musical comedy films
1960s fantasy comedy films
West German films
German musical comedy films
German fantasy comedy films
1960s German-language films
Films directed by Kurt Hoffmann
Films scored by Friedrich Hollaender
Films set in castles
Films shot at Bavaria Studios
German sequel films
1960s ghost films
Constantin Film films
Spessart
German ghost films
1960s German films